Queen Jeongdeok of the Jeongju Ryu clan was the sixth wife of Taejo of Goryeo who came from the same clan with his first wife and bore him seven children. Through her two elder daughters' marriages, she established ties with the powerful Chungju Yu and Hwangju Hwangbo clan, also becoming the maternal grandmother of Queen Heonui, King Seongjong, Queen Heonae, and Queen Heonjeong.

References

Cites

Books

Year of birth unknown
Date of birth unknown
Date of death unknown
Year of death unknown
Consorts of Taejo of Goryeo
People from Chongju